The 1989 season was the San Francisco 49ers' 40th in the National Football League (NFL), their 44th overall and their 1st season  under head coach George Seifert. After going 14–2 in the regular season, the 49ers completed the season with one the most dominant playoff runs of all time, outscoring opponents 126–26, earning their fourth Super Bowl victory and their second consecutive. They finished with the best record in the NFL for the first time since 1987. Their two losses were by a combined 5 points.

In 2007, ESPN.com's Page 2 ranked the 1989 49ers as the greatest team in Super Bowl history.

This was the season where the 49ers added the black trim on the SF logo on the helmets which lasted until the 1995 season.

Quarterback Joe Montana had one of the greatest statistical passing seasons in NFL history in 1989. Montana set a then-NFL record with a passer rating of 112.4, with a completion percentage of 70.2%, and a 26/8 touchdown-to-interception ratio. In the playoffs, Montana was even more dominant, with a 78.3% completion percentage, 800 yards, 11 touchdowns, no interceptions, and a 146.4 rating. Cold Hard Football Facts calls Montana's 1989 season "the one by which we must measure all other passing seasons."

The 1989 49ers ranked #5 on the 100 greatest teams of all time presented by the NFL on its 100th anniversary.

Offseason

NFL Draft

Training Camp 
The 1989 San Francisco 49ers season held training camp at Sierra College in Rocklin, California.

Personnel

Staff

Roster

Preseason

Schedule

Regular season 
The 49ers' offense was just as dominating as it had been during the previous regular season. Quarterback Joe Montana threw for 3,512 yards, 26 touchdowns, and only 8 interceptions, giving him what was then the highest passer rating in NFL history (112.4). Montana also rushed for 227 yards and 3 touchdowns, and earned both the NFL Most Valuable Player Award and the NFL Offensive Player of the Year Award. Wide receiver Jerry Rice had another outstanding season, catching 82 passes for 1,483 yards and 17 touchdowns. Running back Roger Craig was the team's leading rusher with 1,054 yards and 6 touchdowns, and he recorded 49 receptions for 473 yards and another touchdown.

But other stars on the 49ers' offense began to emerge, enabling the team to spread the ball around. After being used primarily as a punt returner during his first 2 seasons, wide receiver John Taylor had a breakout season, catching 60 passes for 1,077 yards and 10 touchdowns, while also returning 36 punts for 417 yards. Tight end Brent Jones recorded 40 receptions for 500 yards. Fullback Tom Rathman had the best season of his career, rushing for 305 yards and catching 73 passes for 616 yards. Even Montana's backup, quarterback Steve Young, had a great year, throwing for 1,001 yards and 8 touchdowns with only 3 interceptions, while also rushing for 126 yards and 2 touchdowns. With all of these weapons, San Francisco's offense led the league in total yards from scrimmage (6,268) and scoring (442 points).

The 49ers' defense was ranked #3 in the NFL. Three starters from the defense made the 1989 All-Pro Team: Ronnie Lott, Don Griffin, and Michael Walter.

Schedule

Season summary

Week 1 at Indianapolis Colts 

Week One proved to be a struggle for the Niners as Joe Montana led five scoring drives, putting the Niners ahead by 23–10 entering the fourth quarter, but then Colts QB Chris Chandler ran in a touchdown early in the fourth quarter, and a 58-yard touchdown bomb to Jerry Rice was answered by a blocked punt and recovery for a touchdown by the Colts, though they could get no closer than a 30–24 Niners margin.

Week 2 at Tampa Bay Buccaneers

Week 3 at Philadelphia Eagles 

The Niners fell behind 21–10 in the fourth but despite giving up a safety Joe Montana erupted, outscoring the Eagles 28–7 and throwing for 428 yards and five touchdowns in total, winning 38–28.

Week 4 vs. Los Angeles Rams

Week 5 at New Orleans Saints 
This game was originally scheduled for Candlestick Park, but was played at the Louisiana Superdome instead because the 49ers' fellow Candlestick Park tenant, the San Francisco Giants, played host to Games 3, 4, and 5 of the 1989 National League Championship Series.  The November 6 game would be moved to San Francisco.

Week 6 at Dallas Cowboys

Week 7 vs. New England Patriots 
This game was played at Stanford Stadium, as Candlestick Park had sustained damage in the Loma Prieta earthquake five days earlier.

Week 8 at New York Jets

Week 9 vs. New Orleans Saints 
This game was originally scheduled for Louisiana Superdome, but was played at Candlestick Park instead, because the originally scheduled October 8 game at Candlestick Park had been moved to the Louisiana Superdome.

Week 10 vs. Atlanta Falcons

Week 11 vs. Green Bay Packers 

The Niners fell to the Green Bay Packers in what would be their final loss of the season, as Don Majkowski ran in two touchdowns and threw for a third, overcoming 325 yards by Joe Montana, who was sacked five times. The 49ers appeared to take the lead in the 4th quarter on an interception return for a touchdown, but a penalty nullified the score.

Week 12 vs. New York Giants

Week 13 at Atlanta Falcons

Week 14 at Los Angeles Rams 

In what many 49ers fans consider one of the greatest regular-season wins in team history, the 49ers came back from a 27–10 4th-quarter deficit to beat the Rams 30–27. The Rams had already beaten the 49ers earlier in the year and looked poised to do it again, but the 49ers, with help from John Taylor's big game, took the lead late with Roger Craig's 1-yard touchdown. John Taylor had 11 catches for an astonishing 286 yards receiving, which included a touchdown catch of 92 yards, and another touchdown catch for 96 yards. Joe Montana was 30 for 42 and passed for 458 yards.

Week 15 vs. Buffalo Bills

Week 16 vs. Chicago Bears

Standings

Playoffs

NFC Divisional Playoffs: vs. (3) Minnesota Vikings

NFC Championship: vs. (5) Los Angeles Rams

Super Bowl XXIV

Game officials

Media

Pre season Local TV

Local Radio

1990 AFC-NFC Pro Bowl

Awards and records 
 Led NFC with 442 points scored
 Led NFL, 27.6 points per game
 Mike Cofer, Led NFL, 136 Points
 Roger Craig, NFC Pro Bowl
 Ronnie Lott, NFC Pro Bowl
 Guy McIntyre, NFC Pro Bowl
 Joe Montana, Most Valuable Player, Super Bowl XXIV
 Joe Montana, NFL Most Valuable Player Award
 Joe Montana, PFWA NFL MVP
 Joe Montana, NEA NFL MVP
 Joe Montana, NFL Offensive Player of the Year Award
 Joe Montana, Offense, UPI NFC Player of the Year
 Joe Montana, Bert Bell Award
 Joe Montana, NFL Passing Leader
 Joe Montana, NFC Pro Bowl
Joe Montana, Associated Press Athlete of the Year
 Jerry Rice, NFL Leader, Receiving Yards
 Jerry Rice, NFL Leader, Receiving Touchdowns
 Jerry Rice, NFC Pro Bowl
 John Taylor, NFC Pro Bowl

Notes

References

External links 
 1989 49ers on Pro Football Reference
 49ers Schedule on jt-sw.com

San Francisco 49ers seasons
San Francisco
NFC West championship seasons
National Football Conference championship seasons
Super Bowl champion seasons
1989 in San Francisco
San